Year 1129 (MCXXIX) was a common year starting on Tuesday (link will display the full calendar) of the Julian calendar.

Events 
 By place 

 Europe 
 April 14 – Following the Capetian tradition, King Louis VI (the Fat) has his eldest son Philip crowned as co-ruler of France at Rheims Cathedral. Louis himself becomes the national protector of all France.
 June 2 – Fulk V, count of Anjou, marries Melisende (daughter of King Baldwin II) the heir to the Kingdom of Jerusalem. Fulk gives up his title which passes to his 15-year-old son, Geoffrey V (the Fair). 
 September – Roger II of Sicily gains recognition as duke at Melfi from the Norman nobles of Naples, Bari, Capua, Salerno and other cities that have resisted him.
 Burgsteinfurt Castle is built in what is now Steinfurt (modern Germany).

 Asia 
 Jin–Song War: Emperor Gao Zong of the Song Dynasty moves the capital from Yangzhou to Hangzhou, after the Jurchen Jin Dynasty captures Kaifeng in the Jingkang Incident.
 March 26 – Gao Zong abdicates the throne after a mutiny of the palace guard. His 2-year-old son Zhao Fu succeeds him, but Empress Meng becomes regent and the sole ruler.
 April 20 – Gao Zong regains the throne (with the support of the imperial army led by General Han Shizhong). Zhao Fu is forced to abdicate with Meng having ruled for 25 days.
 July 24 – Former Emperor Shirakawa dies at his native Kyoto. His son Toba begins his cloistered rule, sharing power with Sutoku, a grandson of Shirakawa.

 By topic 

 Religion 
 January 23 – Henry of Blois becomes bishop of Winchester after the death of William Giffard (who was also Lord Chancellor to King Henry I) in England.

Births 
 Abu al-Abbas as-Sabti, Moroccan Sufi writer (d. 1204)
 Date Tomomune, Japanese nobleman and samurai (d. 1199)
 Elisabeth of Schönau, German Benedictine abbess (d. 1164)
 Henry the Lion, duke of Saxony and Bavaria (d. 1195)
 Theophanes Kerameus, bishop of Rossano (d. 1152)

Deaths 
 January 23 – William Giffard, bishop of Winchester
 January 27 – Ranulf le Meschin, 3rd Earl of Chester (b. 1070)
 January 29 – Minamoto no Shunrai, Japanese poet (b. 1055)
 February 16 – Thoros I, Armenian prince (or 1130)
 February 17 – Constantine II, Armenian prince 
 July 24 – Shirakawa, emperor of Japan (b. 1053)
 July 28 – Zhao Fu, emperor of the Song Dynasty (b. 1127)
 November 21 – Nigel d'Aubigny, Norman nobleman
 December 30 – Roger of Cannae, Italian bishop (b. 1060)
 Athanasius VI bar Khamoro, patriarch of Antioch
 Cellach of Armagh (or Celsus), Irish archbishop (b. 1080)
 Fujiwara no Akinaka, Japanese nobleman (b. 1059)
 John Theristus, Italian Benedictine monk (b. 1049)
 Ramiro Sánchez, Spanish nobleman (or 1130)
 Richard Fitz Pons, Norman nobleman (b. 1080)
 Walter FitzRoger, Norman sheriff of Gloucester
 Zhao Mingcheng, Chinese politician (b. 1081)

References 

 

da:1120'erne#1129